Catherine Bennett (born September 4, 1920) was a Canadian pitcher who played from  through  in the All-American Girls Professional Baseball League. Listed at 5' 5", 120 lb., she batted and threw right-handed.

A native of  Regina, Saskatchewan Bennett was one of the original players to join the All-American Girls Professional Baseball League for its inaugural season.

The league started in 1943 with four teams: the Kenosha Comets, Racine Belles, Rockford Peaches and South Bend Blue Sox. Each team was made up of fifteen girls. Bennett survived the final cut and was assigned to Kenosha.

In her first season, Bennett divided her playing time between Kenosha and South Bend, recording ten consecutive losses to set a league mark. The next year, she improved to a 14–9 record with the Blue Sox.

It was a neglected chapter of sports history, at least until , when  a permanent display was inaugurated at the Baseball Hall of Fame and Museum at Cooperstown, New York, which is dedicated to the entire league rather than any individual figure.

After that, filmmaker Penny Marshall premiered her 1992 film A League of Their Own, a fictional history centered on the first season of the AAGPBL. Starring Geena Davis, Tom Hanks, Madonna, Lori Petty and Rosie O'Donnell, this film brought a rejuvenated interest to the extinct league.

Bennett and 63 other girls who represented Canada in the AAGPBL form part of the aforementioned display at Cooperstown.

Sources

1920 births
All-American Girls Professional Baseball League players
Baseball people from Saskatchewan
Baseball pitchers
Canadian expatriate baseball players in the United States
Kenosha Comets players
Possibly living people
South Bend Blue Sox players
Sportspeople from Regina, Saskatchewan